Biolgina is an extinct genus from a well-known class of fossil marine arthropods, the trilobites. It lived during the Arenig stage of the Ordovician Period, approximately 478 to 471 million years ago.

References

Proetida genera
Ordovician trilobites of North America
Ordovician trilobites of South America